Appenzeller cheese is a hard cow's-milk cheese produced in the Appenzellerland region of northeast Switzerland, in the two modern-day cantons of Appenzell Innerrhoden and Appenzell Ausserrhoden. It is classified as a Swiss-type or Alpine cheese.

History 
Cheese from Appenzellerland has a documented history of at least 700 years, being first mentioned in a document from 1282. However, the manufacturing process is not mentioned and may have been rather different from today. Today, about 75 dairies produce Appenzeller, each with a different recipe for their brine wash. Most of the recipes are trade secrets.

Production 
A herbal brine, sometimes incorporating wine or cider, is applied to the wheels of cheese while they cure, which flavors and preserves the cheese while promoting the formation of a rind.

Variants 
The cheese is straw-colored, with tiny holes and a golden rind. It has a strong smell and a nutty or fruity flavor, which can range from mild to tangy, depending on how long it is aged. Three types are sold:

"Classic". Aged three to four months, mildly spicy. The wheels are wrapped in a silver label.
"Surchoix". Aged four to six months, strongly spicy. Gold label.
"Extra". Aged six months or longer, extra spicy. Black label.

See also

References

External links 

Official Appenzeller page
San Francisco Chronicle, Janet Fletcher, October 21, 2004
Description from Cheese of the Month Club
Epicurious description

Swiss cheeses
Cow's-milk cheeses
Culinary Heritage of Switzerland